James Arnott Thomson (born 28 June 1948) is a Scottish former professional footballer who played as a midfielder.

References

1948 births
Living people
Footballers from Glasgow
Scottish footballers
Association football midfielders
Petershill F.C. players
Newcastle United F.C. players
Barrow A.F.C. players
Grimsby Town F.C. players
Greenock Morton F.C. players
South Shields F.C. (1936) players
Gateshead United F.C. players
Spennymoor Town F.C. players
Newcastle Blue Star F.C. players
English Football League players
Scottish Junior Football Association players